Bahramabad (also Romanized as Bahrāmābād; also known as Baramābād and Barmābād) is a village in Poshtkuh-e Mugui Rural District, in the Central District of Fereydunshahr County, Isfahan Province, Iran. At the 2006 census, its population was 491, in 82 families.

References 

Populated places in Fereydunshahr County